Sir Edmund McNeill Cooper-Key (26 April 1907 – 5 January 1981) was a British Conservative politician.  He was Member of Parliament for Hastings from 1945 until his retirement in 1970.

The son of Captain Edmund Moore Cooper Cooper-Key, C.B., M.V.O., of Landford, Hampshire by his wife Florence (née Wigram), Cooper-Key was educated at the Royal Naval College, Osborne, and Dartmouth. He served in the Irish Guards during the Second World War, and alongside his later political career was a governor and committee member of the RNLI and director of Associated Newspapers Ltd, the Aberdeen Investment Trust, and Price Brothers Ltd. He was created a Knight Bachelor in 1960.

On 11 January 1941 he married Hon. Lorna Peggy Vyvyan Harmsworth (24 October 1920 – 18 June 2014), elder daughter of the 2nd Viscount Rothermere. They had two sons and two daughters; the second – but only surviving – son, (Kevin) Esmond Peter (1943–1985), married Lady Mary-Gaye Georgiana Lorna Curzon, third daughter of the 6th Earl Howe, whose daughter by her second husband, property magnate and scion of baronets John Anstruther-Gough-Calthorpe, is the actress Isabella Calthorpe.

He lived at Burnt Wood, Battle, East Sussex.

References

External links 
 

1907 births
1981 deaths
Conservative Party (UK) MPs for English constituencies
UK MPs 1945–1950
UK MPs 1950–1951
UK MPs 1951–1955
UK MPs 1955–1959
UK MPs 1959–1964
UK MPs 1964–1966
UK MPs 1966–1970
Knights Bachelor